Azienda Mobilità e Trasporti Autobus Bari (AMTAB) (Mobility and Bus Transport Company Bari) is a public company, responsible for public transportation in Bari city in Italy.

Notes and references

Bus transport in Italy
Public transport in Italy
Transport in Bari